Bojnik is a town and municipality located in the Jablanica District of southern Serbia. According to 2011 census, the population of the town is 6,688 and population of the municipality was 11,073.

History
Much of the population settled in Bojnik after World War II. On 17 February 1942, Bulgarian occupation forces massacred all 476 inhabitants of Bojnik in response to the alleged sheltering of Partisans.

Geography
Bojnik municipality is located in southern Serbia and it is surrounded by municipality of Medveđa in the south-west, municipality of Lebane in the south, municipality of Leskovac in the east, and municipalities of Žitorađa and Prokuplje in the north.

Settlements
Aside from the town of Bojnik, the following villages consist the municipality of Bojnik:

Demographics

According to the 2011 census results, the municipality has 11,104 inhabitants.

Ethnic groups
The ethnic composition of the municipality:

Economy
The following table gives a preview of total number of employed people per their core activity (as of 2017):

Gallery

See also
 Subdivisions of Serbia
 Bojnik-Kosančić Airport

References

External links

 

 
Populated places in Jablanica District
Municipalities and cities of Southern and Eastern Serbia